Sprinkler system may refer to:

 Irrigation sprinkler, a device for irrigation of lawns or crops
 Fire sprinkler system, the entire systems of pipes and sprinklers intended for fire suppression within buildings